John Aubrey (1626–1697), was an English antiquary and writer.

John Aubrey may also refer to:

Sir John Aubrey, 2nd Baronet (c. 1650–1700), English MP for Brackley
Sir John Aubrey, 3rd Baronet (1680–1743), British MP for Cardiff
Sir John Aubrey, 6th Baronet (1739–1826), British MP for Wallingford, Aylesbury, Buckinghamshire, Clitheroe, Aldeburgh, Steyning, and Horsham
Jack Aubrey, fictional character in the Aubrey–Maturin series of novels by Patrick O'Brian

See also
Tiny Gooch (John Aubrey Gooch, 1903–1986), American football player
Sir John Aubrey-Fletcher, 7th Baronet (1912–1992), British soldier and cricketer